The Louisville Thoroughbreds are a men's chorus based in Louisville, Kentucky.  They are the first 7-time International Champion chorus of the Barbershop Harmony Society, winning the Gold Medal in 1962, 1966, 1969, 1974, 1978, 1981 and 1984.

Awards and recognition

See also
 List of attractions and events in the Louisville metropolitan area

External links
 
 

A cappella musical groups
Choirs in Louisville, Kentucky
Barbershop Harmony Society choruses
Musical groups established in 1945
1945 establishments in Kentucky